Irina Fedotova may refer to:
 Irina Fedotova (model), Russian model, artist and fashion designer
Irina Fedotova (rower), Russian Olympic athlete
Irina Fedotova (activist), Russian human rights activist

See also 

 Irina Fedorova (disambiguation)